Ságat is a Sámi newspaper written in Norwegian that is published in Leavdnja, Finnmark, Norway.

History and profile
Ságat was founded in Vadsø in 1957 and moved to Leavdnja in 1981, where it still is based today. It maintains offices and reporters in Deatnu, Kárášjohka, Evenášši, Máttá-Várjjat, and Áltá, Norway.

The editor since 1978 has been Geir Wulff. Since October 2008, the paper has published five days per week on weekdays. Later it became a daily newspaper.

Ságat had a circulation of 2,717 copies  in 2007. Although the original idea of the newspaper was that it should have articles written in both Sámi and Norwegian, today it uses Norwegian almost exclusively in its articles.

Editors-in-chief
 Kristian Olsen 1956–1957
 Hans J. Henriksen and Thor Frette 1958–1961
 Hans J. Henriksen 1961–1964
 Nils Jernsletten 1964–1966
 Isak Østmo 1966–1966
 Hans J. Henriksen 1966–1967
 Albert Johansen 1967–1968
 Odd Mathis Hætta 1968–1974
 Peder Andreas Varsi, Johan Store and Arne Wulff 1974–1975
 Geir Wulff 1976
 Bjarne Store Jakobsen 1976–1978
 Geir Wulff 1978–

References

External links
Official homepage

1957 establishments in Norway
Culture in Finnmark
Daily newspapers published in Norway
Publications established in 1957
Sámi in Norway
Sámi newspapers